Daniel O'Donoghue may refer to:

 Daniel John O'Donoghue (1844–1907), Irish-born labour leader and political figure in Ontario
 Daniel O'Donoghue (Irish politician) (died 1889), Member of Parliament, 1857–1885
Daniel William O'Donoghue (1876-1948), U.S. federal judge 
Danny O'Donoghue, Irish singer-songwriter